The 2014–15 FC Terek Grozny season was the sixth successive season that the club will play in the Russian Premier League, the highest tier of association football in Russia, and 7th in total. Terek Grozny will also be taking part in the Russian Cup.

Squad

Out on loan

Transfers

In

Out

Loans in

Loans out

Released

Friendlies

Competitions

Russian Premier League

Results by round

Matches

League table

Russian Cup

Squad statistics

Appearances and goals

|-
|colspan="14"|Players away from the club on loan:
|-
|colspan="14"|Players who appeared for Terek Grozny no longer at the club:

|}

Goal scorers

Disciplinary record

Notes
 MSK time changed from UTC+4 to UTC+3 permanently on 26 October 2014.

References

FC Akhmat Grozny seasons
Terek Grozny